Hoseynabad-e Jadid (also Romanized as Ḩoseynābād-e Jadīd; also known as Ḩoseynābād) is a village in Kuhestan Rural District, Rostaq District, Darab County, Fars Province, Iran. At the 2006 census, its population was 92, in 20 families.

References 

Populated places in Darab County